Flavien Le Postollec (born 19 February 1984) is an Ivorian-Breton retired footballer who last played as a midfielder for Deinze in the Belgian First Division B. He is currently employed as an assistant manager at Deinze.

Le Postollec began his professional football career with Lille OSC, and went on loan to FC Brussels in 2007.

He moved to France at a young age.

References

External links
 
 
 
 

1984 births
Living people
French footballers
Ivorian footballers
French sportspeople of Ivorian descent
Lille OSC players
Association football midfielders
R.W.D.M. Brussels F.C. players
US Créteil-Lusitanos players
K.A.S. Eupen players
R.A.E.C. Mons players
Oud-Heverlee Leuven players
K.M.S.K. Deinze players
Belgian Pro League players
Challenger Pro League players
French expatriate footballers
Expatriate footballers in Belgium
French expatriate sportspeople in Belgium